Henri Pequet (1 February 1888 – 13 March 1974) was a pilot in the first official airmail flight on February 18, 1911. The 23-year-old Frenchman, in India for an airshow, delivered about 6,500 letters when he flew from an Allahabad polo field to Naini, about 10 kilometers away. He flew a Humber-Sommer biplane with about fifty horsepower (37 kW), and made the journey in thirteen minutes.

The letters were marked "First Aerial Post, U.P. Exhibition Allahabad 1911."

References

External links
 Aerophilately
 Henri Pequet bio at Ralph Cooper's website
  Henri Pecquet - Champagne|Berceau De L'Aviation

1888 births
1974 deaths
French aviators
Aviation pioneers
History of Allahabad